Avan Sar (also Romanized as Āvān Sar; also known as Amvey) is a village in Jushin Rural District, Kharvana District, Varzaqan County, East Azerbaijan Province, Iran. At the 2006 census, its population was 28, in 6 families.

References 

Towns and villages in Varzaqan County